The Journal of Systems and Software is a computer science journal in the area of software systems, established in 1979 and published by Elsevier.

Content and scope 
The journal publishes research papers, state-of-the-art surveys, and practical experience reports. It includes papers covering issues of programming methodology, software engineering, and hardware/software systems. Topics include: "software systems, prototyping issues, high-level specification techniques, procedural and functional programming techniques, data-flow concepts, multiprocessing, real-time, distributed, concurrent, and telecommunications systems, software metrics, reliability models for software, performance issues, and management concerns."

Abstracting and indexing 
According to the 2021 Journal Citation Reports, the Journal of Systems and Software has an impact factor of 3.514.
According to Google Scholar, the journal has an h5-index of 61, which ranks third among international publication venues in software systems, after ICSE and IEEE Transactions on Software Engineering.

Past and present editors-in-chief 

 John Manley and Alan Salisbury (1979–1983)
 Richard E. Fairley (1984–1985)
 Robert L. Glass (1986–2001)
 David N. Card (2002–2008)
 Hans van Vliet (2009–2017)
 Paris Avgeriou and David Shepherd (2018–current)

Notable articles
A few of the most notable (downloaded) articles are:
 Software defect prediction based on enhanced metaheuristic feature selection optimization and a hybrid deep neural network
 A software engineering perspective on engineering machine learning systems: State of the art and challenges
 MeTeaM: A method for characterizing mature software metrics teams

References

External links
 
 Online access

Publications established in 1979
Computer science journals
Software engineering publications
Systems engineering
Elsevier academic journals
English-language journals
Monthly journals